The Golden Lion Hotel is in the coastal English town of Hunstanton, King's Lynn and West Norfolk, Norfolk, England. It is a three-star hotel and has been a Grade II listed building since 20 September 1984.

Location 
The hotel stands in a prominent position on the landward side of Cliff Parade overlooking the Green. It has wide panoramic views of the sea and Hunstanton's main beach.

History 
The area in which this hotel stands was conceived as New Hunstanton and was the brain child of Henry Le Strange of Hunstanton Hall. Le Strange wanted Hunstanton to develop as a sea-side resort with the expected arrival of the railway, which finally arrived in 1862. Le Strange's son Hamon controlled the later part of the scheme, and he employed several London architects to bring his father's plans to realization. One of those architects was William Butterfield, who had a hand in redeveloping the original New Inn into the Golden Lion Hotel.

Description 
The building seen today is built from the local carrstone, which is laid in a random coursed manner around the doorways and windows are dressed with stone quoins and mullions in the high Victorian Tudor Gothic style. The building is set on an L-shaped ground floor plan.

References 

Hunstanton
Hotels in Norfolk
Hotels established in 1850
Grade II listed hotels
William Butterfield buildings